"Premier Love" is a 2007 song recorded by NBA player Tony Parker. It was the singer's second single from his eponymous album TP as a follow-up to "Balance-toi", a big success and a chart -topping single for Parker in France. "Premier Love" is a bilingual song in French and English and the English parts are performed by the featured artist Rickwel. It was released in October 2007, Written by Eloquence and Tony Parker, it was produced by French producer and DJ Skalp.

Charts

References

2007 songs
Tony Parker songs
Macaronic songs